Bearss is a surname. Notable people with the surname include:

A. C. Bearss, American politician
Ed Bearss, (1923–2020), United States Marine Corps veteran, military historian and writer
Hiram I. Bearss (1875–1938), United States Marine Corps officer and Medal of Honor recipient

See also
 Bearss lime, a citrus fruit species of hybrid origin